Chintaparthi is a major Panchayathi in Valmikipuram Mandal (previously Vayalpadu Mandal) on the Madanapalle-Tirupathi Highway in Annamayya district of the Indian state of Andhra Pradesh.

In the 2011 census it had a population of 7468 in 1951 households.

External links

References

Villages in Annamayya district